This Ulster and Delaware train station, MP 19.2, was a busy station, serving an even busier town. This station was actually located in the village of West Shokan, with the actual town of Shokan being a mile east of the station itself. This station was the stop for summer residents staying at boarding houses, and a stop for local people going to church or school. The station was abandoned on June 8, 1913, and the site is now underwater, as the Ashokan Reservoir was built where  of U&D trackage used to be.

References

Railway stations in the Catskill Mountains
Former Ulster and Delaware Railroad stations
Railway stations in Ulster County, New York
Railway stations closed in 1913
Former railway stations in New York (state)
1913 disestablishments in New York (state)